Life Sketches: Piano Music of Nils Vigeland is pianist Jenny Q Chai's second album, consisting of compositions by her mentor and collaborator Nils Vigeland. The track listing five works spanning forty years in their date of composition. It was released under the  Naxos Records label on September 2, 2014.

Allora e ora is a suite of character pieces on various Italian subjects, and has an elaborate use of the sostenuto pedal.

Five Pieces is also a character suite, though the subject matter is abstract, and focuses on the textural aspects of the piano. Vigeland composed Five Pieces specifically for Chai.

Track listing
All pieces composed by Nils Vigeland.

References

2014 classical albums
Instrumental albums